The Begin–Sadat Center for Strategic Studies (BESA Center) is an Israeli think tank affiliated with Bar-Ilan University and supported by the NATO Mediterranean Initiative, conducting policy-relevant research on Middle Eastern and global strategic affairs, particularly as they relate to the national security and foreign policy of Israel and regional peace and stability. The center's mission is to contribute to promoting peace and security in the Middle East, through policy-oriented researches on national security in the Middle East. It is located at the Social Sciences Faculty of Bar-Ilan University. The center was founded by Thomas Hecht, a Canadian-Jewish leader, and was dedicated to Menachem Begin and Anwar Sadat, who signed the Egypt–Israel peace treaty, the first peace agreement ever signed between Israel and an Arab country.

About the BESA Center

BESA according to BESA
Professor Efraim Inbar describes the center's mission as follows: "Over the years, we have been the first to successfully place on the public agenda issues such as the problematic aspects of Palestinian statehood, the danger of Arab chemical and biological weapons and missile stocks, Israel's relations with key countries such as Turkey and India, and the abuse of international institutions in the attempt to delegitimize Israel. Today, the Center leads an attempt to introduce creative thinking about alternatives to the entrenched two-state paradigm in Israeli-Palestinian peace diplomacy, and an initiative to nourish U.S.-Israeli relations."

The center is staffed with strategic thinkers, academic experts and "military men". BESA Center publications and policy recommendations are directed at senior Israeli decision-makers in military and civilian life, the defense and foreign affairs establishments in Israel and abroad, the diplomatic corps, the press, the academic community, leaders of Jewish communities around the world, and the educated public.

Position and orientation
BESA normally takes a center-right and pro-military viewpoint on policy. In 2009, Inbar's paper "The Rise and Fall of the 'Two States for Two Peoples' Paradigm" said that in light of Hamas's takeover of the Gaza Strip, the best solution to the Israeli–Palestinian conflict would be to repartition the country with Egypt governing Gaza, Jordan governing the West Bank, and Israel withdrawing from isolated settlements.

Impact and status
BESA is one of approximately 35 think tanks in Israel, which, according to Hannah Elka Meyers, typically have little impact on politics or policymaking despite their numbers. She notes in her study that even the heads of Israeli think tanks concede their lack of impact on politics, and quotes Inbar as saying, "We should be modest in our evaluation of the impact of think tanks." Issues that keep Israeli think tanks from being as influential as those in the U.S. include their more academic focus, lack of funding, the nation's political structure, and Israeli citizens' attitudes about government. While BESA staff includes numerous "military men", Meyers notes that the IDF has similar, if not independent research and strategy facilities but with access to classified information.

In the University of Pennsylvania's 2014 Global Go To Think Tanks Report, the center was ranked the ninth best think thank in the Middle East and North Africa, behind the Carnegie Middle East Center (Lebanon), ACPSS (Egypt), Brookings (Qatar), EDAM (Turkey), INSS (Israel), Al Jazeera Centre for Studies, (AJCS) (Qatar), TESEV (Turkey), and GRC (Saudi Arabia).

In 2017, some members of BESA split off to create the new Jerusalem Institute for Strategic Studies (JISS), which takes a similar approach to security issues.

Funding 
Both BESA and the Jerusalem Institute of Strategic Studies are funded by the Australian philanthropist Greg Rosshandler of Melbourne.

Publications
 Perspectives Paper
 Mideast Security and Policy Studies
 Books
 News Bulletin

References

External links
The BESA Center Homepage

Anwar Sadat
Bar-Ilan University
Foreign policy and strategy think tanks
Menachem Begin
Political research institutes
Think tanks based in Israel